Marcus Porcius Cato can refer to:

Cato the Elder (consul 195 BC)
Cato the Younger (praetor 54 BC)
Marcus Porcius Cato (consul 118 BC)
Marcus Porcius Cato (consul 36)
Marcus Porcius Cato (father of Cato the Younger)
Marcus Porcius Cato (son of Cato the Younger)
Marcus Porcius Cato Licinianus (praetor 152 BC)
Marcus Porcius Cato Salonianus (praetor )